The Stade Jacques Rimbault is a football stadium located in Bourges, France. It is the home ground of Championnat National 2 club Bourges Foot 18.

Opened in 1991, the stadium was initially called the Stade des Grosses Plantes before being renamed after , the mayor of Bourges who died in 1993.

Notable matches 
The Stade Jacques Rimbault hosted all professional Division 2 home fixtures of FC Bourges during the 1993–94 season.

The stadium notably hosted a match between the France U21 and Estonia U21 national teams on 27 May 2009, the game ending in a 3–0 victory for the French. The final of the 2011–12 Coupe de France Féminine was also hosted here, when Lyon beat Montpellier by a score of 2–1. Lastly, the semi-finals of the 2016–17 Coupe Gambardella took place at the stadium, which was a neutral venue.

References

External links 
 Bourges 18 website
 Bourges Foot website

Bourges 18
Football venues in France
Sports venues in Centre-Val de Loire
Sports venues completed in 1991
1991 establishments in France